The Race of My Life: An Autobiography is the autobiography of Indian athlete Milkha Singh, coauthored with daughter Sonia Sanwalka.  The film Bhaag Milkha Bhaag is based on it.

Summary
Milkha Singh, a sikh boy born around 1930s, runs against trains for fun. A lot of his family  members who belong to Milkha Singh family, including his parents, are killed in the Partition of India. After many attempts, he is finally able to join the Indian army. Whilst in the army, his athletic skills show. He wins gold medals in the 1958 Asian Games and 1958 Commonwealth Games. After winning the friendly race between India and Pakistan, in 1960, he earns the title of The Flying Sikh by Ayub Khan. However, he loses the bronze medal by fraction of a second at the 1960 Summer Olympics, due to a judgement error on the race track. In 1963, he marries his longtime love Nirmal Kaur, former captain of India's women's volleyball team. In 1971, their son Jeev Milkha Singh is born. Jeev, also a sportsman, became a world class golfer.

Bhaag Milkha Bhaag
Singh said that after reading his autobiography, a few  Bollywood directors approached him, asking to make a film on his life. Singh's son, Jeev Milkha Singh, decided that the film rights be given to Rakeysh Omprakash Mehra. Singh sold the rights for 1, with a clause that 10-15% of the film's profits would be donated to his charitable trust.

Farhan Akhtar starred as Singh, and Sonam Kapoor starred as Biro–inspired by one of Singh's real love interests. Made on a budget of 30 crore, Bhaag Milkha Bhaag grossed 164 crore worldwide. It was one of the highest grossing 2013 Bollywood films.

Of the film and Akhtar's portrayal of him, Singh said "Farhan Akhtar has done a brilliant job. He looked like my duplicate in the movie. The director, too, did a great a job. Also, the dialogues and the lyrics by Prasoon Joshi are brilliant. There was nothing which I felt should be changed in the movie, it was perfect."

Reception
IBN Live panned The Race of My Life as disappointing, as they felt that it was "nothing but part of a deal for the movie's production."

References
Notes

Citations

External links
 
The Race of My Life at Rupa Publications
The Race of My Life at Goodreads

Indian autobiographies
Sports autobiographies
Autobiographies adapted into films
Partition of India in fiction
Rupa Publications books
21st-century Indian books